The Mars Reconnaissance Orbiter's HiRISE instrument has taken many images that strongly suggest that Mars has had a rich history of water-related processes.  Many features of Mars appear to be created by large amounts of water.  That Mars once possessed large amounts of water was confirmed by isotope studies in a study published in March 2015, by a team of scientists showing that the ice caps were highly enriched with deuterium, heavy hydrogen, by seven times as much as the Earth.  This means that Mars has lost a volume of water 6.5 times what is stored in today's polar caps.  The water for a time would have formed an ocean in the low-lying Mare Boreum. The amount of water could have covered the planet about 140 meters, but was probably in an ocean that in places would be almost 1 mile deep.

A major discovery  by HiRISE was finding evidence of hot springs. These may have contained life and may now contain well-preserved fossils of life.

Recurring slope lineae
Seasonal flows on warm Martian slopes (also called recurring slope lineae, recurrent slope lineae and RSL)  are thought to be salty water flows occurring during the warmest months on Mars.  Indeed, there is much photographic and spectroscopic evidence that water does today flow on parts of Mars.

Some researchers have proposed that the flow is aided by the water boiling in thin Martian atmosphere.  Boiling water would cause soil particles to bounce and help them to flow down slopes.

In a study published in Icarus in 2016, A team, headed by David Stillman, identified 239 locations for recurring slope lineae  within Valles Marineris.  About half of lineae locations on Mars are in Valles Marineris.  It was found that the lengthening of the lineae depends on how the slope is orientated.  Lengthening was observed in all seasons inside Valles Marineris.  This long active season suggests that there must be an appreciable source of water that supplies the lineae. Calculations show that the lineae are active between minus 27 degrees C and minus 9 degrees C to display the activity observed. Water would do this if it was in a brine  having of tens of wt% salt.

Although these features were initially thought to be evidence of current water flow, some studies show that little or no water may be involved.  An analysis of data from the Mars Odyssey Neutron Spectrometer revealed that the RSL sites do not contain any more water than found at anywhere else at similar latitudes.  The authors concluded that RSL are not supplied by large, near-surface briny aquifers.  It is still possible with this data that water vapor from deeply buried ice, from the atmosphere, or from small deeply buried aquifers.

A study published in Nature Geoscience, suggest that very little water is involved in creating recurrent slope lineae because these streaks only occur on steep slopes—slopes that would allow dry sand and dust to move down.  If water were involved, at least some of the lineae would move onto lower slopes.  Small amounts of water may start the process however.
A study spanning 4 Martian years concluded that a dry origin was the most likely cause of the streaks.  In the study region, Tivat Crater, rockfall markings faded at the same time as recurrent slope lineae (RSL), suggesting a fading mechanism that acts across the whole crater.

Eridania Lake

Eridania Lake is a theorized ancient lake with a surface area of roughly 1.1 million square kilometers.  Its maximum depth is 2,400 meters and its volume is 562,000km.  It was larger than the largest landlocked sea on Earth, the Caspian Sea and contained more water than all the other martian lakes together.  The Eridania sea held more than 9 times as much water as all of America's Great Lakes.   The upper surface of the lake was assumed to be at the elevation of valley networks that surround the lake; they  all end at the same elevation, suggesting that they emptied into a lake.

Research with CRISM found thick deposits, greater than 400 meters thick, that contained the minerals saponite, talc-saponite, Fe-rich mica (for example, glauconite-nontronite), Fe- and Mg-serpentine, Mg-Fe-Ca-carbonate and probable Fe-sulphide.  The Fe-sulphide probably formed in deep water from water heated by volcanoes.  Such a process, classified as hydrothermal may have been a place where life began.   Saponite, talc, talc-saponite, nontronite, glauconite, and serpentine are all common on the seafloors on Earth.  The earliest evidence of life on Earth appear in seafloor deposits that are similar to those found in the Eridania basin.  So, samples of material from the Eridania may give us insight into the environment of the early Earth.  Chloride deposits were found where a shoreline existed.  They were deposited as water evaporated from the sea.  These chloride deposits are thought to be thin (less than 30 meters), because some craters do not display the chemical in their ejecta.  A crater's ejecta contains material from under the surface, therefore if the chloride deposits were very deep they would have appeared in the ejecta.

Branched channels
Research, in the January 2010 issue of Icarus, described strong evidence for sustained precipitation in the area around Valles Marineris. The types of minerals there are associated with water. Also, the high density of small branching channels indicates a great deal of precipitation because they are similar to stream channels on the Earth.

Inverted relief

Some places on Mars show inverted relief. In these locations, a stream bed appears as a raised feature, instead of a depression. The inverted former stream channels may be caused by the deposition of large rocks or due to cementation of loose materials. In either case erosion would erode the surrounding land and consequently leave the old channel as a raised ridge because the ridge will be more resistant to erosion. Images below, taken with HiRISE show sinuous ridges that are old channels that have become inverted.

In an article published in January 2010, a large group of scientists endorsed the idea of searching for life in Miyamoto Crater because of inverted stream channels and minerals that indicated the past presence of water.

Chloride deposits
Using data from Mars Global Surveyor, Mars Odyssey and the Mars Reconnaissance Orbiter, scientists have found widespread deposits of chloride minerals. Some of these chloride deposits have been identified to be a mixture of anhydrous chloride salt and regional basaltic regolith. These are located in the southern highlands of Mars. Usually chlorides are the last minerals to come out of solution. A picture below shows some deposits within the Phaethontis quadrangle. Evidence suggests that the deposits were formed from the evaporation of mineral-enriched waters. Lakes may have been scattered over large areas of the Martian surface. Carbonates, sulfates, and silica should precipitate out ahead of them. Sulfates and silica have been discovered by the Mars rovers. Places with chloride minerals may have once held various life forms. Furthermore, such areas should preserve traces of ancient life.

Layers

Rocks on Mars have been found to frequently occur as layers, called strata, in many different places. Columbus Crater is one of many craters that contain layers. Rock can form layers in a variety of ways. Volcanoes, wind, or water can produce layers.  Many places on Mars show rocks arranged in layers. Scientists are happy about finding layers on Mars since layers may have formed under large bodies of water.  Layers may be formed by groundwater rising up depositing minerals and cementing sediments.  The hardened layers are consequently more protected from erosion.  This process may occur instead of layers forming under lakes.  

Sometimes the layers display different colors. Light-toned rocks on Mars have been associated with hydrated minerals like sulfates. The Mars rover Opportunity examined such layers close-up with several instruments. Some layers are probably made up of fine particles because they seem to break up into fine dust. In contrast, other layers break up into large boulders so they are probably much harder. Basalt, a volcanic rock, is thought to form layers composed of boulders. Basalt has been identified all over Mars. Instruments on orbiting spacecraft have detected clay (also called phyllosilicates) in some layers.  Scientists are excited about finding hydrated minerals such as sulfates and clays on Mars because they are usually formed in the presence of water.  Places that contain clays and/or other hydrated minerals would be good places to look for evidence of life.

More research using data collected by the SHARAD (SHAllow RAdar Detector) on the MRO has found layers of ice-water interspersed with dirt at the northern pole under the Planum Boreum. The layering is believed to have come from the global warming and cooling cycle on Mars; during cooling periods, water migrated to the poles and formed the ice-water layers, while on subsequent warming, the unthawed ice water was covered by layers of dust and dirt from windstorms on the surface, helping to preserve the ice water.

Below are a few of the many examples of layers that have been studied with HiRISE.

Mantle

Much of the surface of Mars is covered by a thick smooth mantle that is thought to be a mixture of ice and dust.  This ice-rich mantle, a few yards thick, smoothes the land. But in places it displays a bumpy texture, resembling the surface of a basketball. Because there are few craters on this mantle, the mantle is relatively young.

It's generally accepted that mantle is ice-rich dust that fell from the sky as snow and ice-coated dust grains during a different climate    One evidence of its ice-rich nature is the presence of gullies which form when some of the ice melts.

The images below, all taken with HiRISE, show a variety of views of this smooth mantle.

Ring mold craters
Ring Mold Craters are kind of crater on the planet Mars, that look like the ring molds used in baking. They are thought to be caused by an impact into ice.  The ice is covered by a layer of debris.  They are found in parts of Mars that have buried ice.  Laboratory experiments confirm that impacts into ice result in a "ring mold shape."  Impacts into ice warm the ice and cause it to flow into the ring mold shape. ,

Gullies 

Changes in Mars's orbit and tilt cause significant changes in the distribution of water ice from polar regions down to latitudes equivalent to Texas. During certain climate periods water vapor leaves polar ice and enters the atmosphere. The water returns to the ground at lower latitudes as deposits of frost or snow mixed generously with dust. The atmosphere of Mars contains a great deal of fine dust particles.  Water vapor condenses on the particles, then they fall down to the ground due to the additional weight of the water coating. When ice at the top of the mantling layer goes back into the atmosphere, it leaves behind dust, which insulates the remaining ice.

HiRISE has carried out many observations of gullies that are assumed to have been caused by recent flows of liquid water. Many gullies are imaged over and over to see if any changes occur. Some repeat observations of gullies have displayed changes that some scientists argue were caused by liquid water over the period of just a few years.  Others say the flows were merely dry flows.  These were first discovered by the Mars Global Surveyor.

Alternate theories for the creation of surface gullies and channels include wind erosion, liquid carbon dioxide, and liquid methane.

Observations with HiRISE show widespread activity in southern hemisphere gullies, especially in those that appear fresh. Significant channel incision and large-scale mass movements have been seen.  The timing of gully activity is seasonal and happens during the period when seasonal frost is present and defrosting.

Observations over the past few years support a model in which currently active gully formation is driven mainly by seasonal CO2 frost.  Simulations described in a 2015 conference, show that high pressure CO2 gas trapping in the subsurface can cause debris flows.  The conditions that can lead to this are found in latitudes where gullies occur.  This research was described in a later article entitled, "Formation of gullies on Mars by debris flows triggered by CO2 sublimation."  In the model, CO2 ice accumulates in the cold winter.  It piles up on a frozen permafrost layer that consists of ice-cemented dirt.  When the higher intensity sunlight of spring begins, light penetrates the translucent dry ice layer, consequently warming the   ground.  The CO2 ice absorbs heat and sublimates—that is changes directly from a solid to a gas.  This gas builds up pressure because it is trapped between the ice and the frozen ground.  Eventually, pressure builds up enough to explode through the ice taking with it soil particles.  The dirt particles mix with the pressurized gas and act as a fluid that can flow down the slope and carve gullies.

Below are some of the many hundreds of gullies that have been studied with HiRISE.

Glaciers

Glaciers, loosely defined as patches of currently or recently flowing ice, are thought to be present across large but restricted areas of the modern Martian surface, and are inferred to have been more widely distributed at times in the past. Lobate convex features on the surface known as viscous flow features and lobate debris aprons, which show the characteristics of non-Newtonian flow, are now almost unanimously regarded as true glaciers. However, a variety of other features on the surface have also been interpreted as directly linked to flowing ice, such as fretted terrain, lineated valley fill, concentric crater fill, and arcuate ridges. A variety of surface textures seen in imagery of the midlatitudes and polar regions are also thought to be linked to sublimation of glacial ice.

Radar from the Mars Reconnaissance Orbiter gave a strong reflection from the top and base of LDAs, meaning that pure water ice made up the bulk of the formation (between the two reflections).  Because the surfaces of lobate debris flows, concentric crater fill, and lineated valley flows look similar, its assumed that all may contain water ice under a relatively thin layer of insulating debris.

The possibility of water ice in LDAs and other glacial features demonstrates that water is found at even lower latitudes. Future colonists on Mars will be able to tap into these ice deposits, instead of having to travel to much higher latitudes. Another major advantage of these glacial landscapes over other sources of Martian water is that they can easily detected and mapped from orbit. Lobate debris aprons are shown below from the Phlegra Montes, which are at latitude of 38.2 degrees north, so the discovery of water ice in LDAs greatly expands the range of easily available on Mars.  It is far easier to land a spaceship near the equator of Mars, so the closer water is available to the equator the better it will be for future colonists.

Lobate debris aprons

Of interest from the days of the Viking Orbiters are piles of material surrounding cliffs; they are now called lobate debris aprons (LDAs). These features have a convex topography and a gentle slope from cliffs or escarpments; this suggests flow away from the steep source cliff. In addition, lobate debris aprons can show surface lineations just as rock glaciers on the Earth.

Lineated valley fill 

Concentric crater fill

Tongue-shaped glaciers

Other ice-related features

Exposed ice sheets

Huge, easy to get to, deposits of ice were found by a team of researchers using instruments on board the Mars Reconnaissance Orbiter (MRO).  The scientists found eight eroding slopes showing exposed water ice sheets as thick as 100 meters.   Much evidence of buried ice under the ground on vast regions of Mars has already been found by past studies, but this study found that the ice was only covered by a layer of about 1 or 2 meters thick of soil.  Shane Byrne of the University of Arizona Lunar and Planetary Laboratory, Tucson,  one of the co-authors  remarked that future colonists of the Red Planet would be able to gather up ice with just a bucket and shovel.   
The layered ice is exposed in triangular shaped depressions.  One wall is very steep and faces the pole.  The fact that water-ice makes up the layers was confirmed by Compact Reconnaissance Imaging Spectrometer for Mars (CRISM) on board the Mars Reconnaissance Orbiter (MRO).  The spectra gathered by CRISM showed strong signals of water.

These triangular depressions bare some resemblance to scalloped terrain.  Scalloped topography is common in the mid-latitudes of Mars, between 45° and 60° north and south.

For several reasons, the ice-rich clifts (scarps) are suspected to be ground ice instead of thin, temporary frost. Their blue color stays even after seasonal frost, indicated by blue color, has disappeared from the surroundings and from higher, colder locations.  Also, Thermal Emission Imaging System (THEMIS) measurements show a temperature in the late-afternoon that is above the frost point. This means that any frost would have melted in the heat of the day.
"There is shallow ground ice under roughly a third of the Martian surface," said the study's lead author, Colin Dundas of the U.S. Geological Survey's Astrogeology Science Center in Flagstaff, Arizona. " This image confirms what was previously detected with the spectrometer on 2001 Mars Odyssey, the ground-penetrating radars on MRO and on Mars Express, and by the Phoenix lander in situ excavation.  The Phoenix lander actually exposed an ice layer with its landing rockets.
Besides being of immense value to future explorers, these ice layers could help us better understand the climate history of Mars.  They provide a record of the past.  Since Mars experiences great variations in its tilt, it also goes through dramatic climate variations.  These changes may be able to be tracked with study of these layers.  Mars does not possess a large moon to keep its tilt stable.  Today, ice is concentrated at the poles, with a greater tilt, more ice will exist at mid-latitudes.

Scalloped topography
Scalloped topography is common in the mid-latitudes of Mars, between 45° and 60° north and south. It is particularly prominent in the region of Utopia Planitia in the northern hemisphere and in the region of Peneus and Amphitrites Patera in the southern hemisphere. Such topography consists of shallow, rimless depressions with scalloped edges, commonly referred to as "scalloped depressions" or simply "scallops". Scalloped depressions can be isolated or clustered and sometimes seem to coalesce. A typical scalloped depression displays a gentle equator-facing slope and a steeper pole-facing scarp. This topographic asymmetry is probably due to differences in insolation. Scalloped depressions are thought to form from the removal of subsurface material, possibly interstitial ice, by sublimation. This process may still be happening at present.

Ice in craters

Research, reported in the journal Science in September 2009, demonstrated that some new craters on Mars show exposed, pure, water ice. After a time, the ice disappears, evaporating into the atmosphere. The ice is only a few feet deep. The ice was confirmed with the Compact Imaging Spectrometer (CRISM) on board the Mars Reconnaissance Orbiter (MRO). The ice was found in five locations. Three of the locations are in the Cebrenia quadrangle. These locations are 55.57° N, 150.62° E; 43.28° N, 176.9° E; and 45° N, 164.5° E. Two others are in the Diacria quadrangle: 46.7° N, 176.8° E and 46.33° N, 176.9° E.
This discovery proves that future colonists on Mars will be able to obtain water from a wide variety of locations. The ice can be dug up, melted, then taken apart to provide fresh oxygen and hydrogen for rocket fuel. Hydrogen was the powerful fuel used by the Space Shuttle main engines.

Rootless cones

So-called "Rootless cones" are caused by explosions of lava with ground ice under the flow. The ice melts and turns into a vapor that expands in an explosion that produces a cone or ring. Features like these are found in Iceland, when lavas cover water-saturated substrates.

Columnar jointing 

In 2009, HiRISE discovered columnar jointing in rocks on Mars.  Such jointing is accepted as having involved water. To make the parallel cracks of columnar jointing, more cooling is necessary, and water is the most logical choice. Scientists calculate that the water was present intermittently for a few months to a few years.

Light-toned layered deposits 
HiRISE has sent back many images of large surface areas that are termed "light-toned layered deposits."  These 30–80 meter thick deposits are thought to have been formed from the action of water. They contain evidence of stream channel systems.  Furthermore, chemical data from the Compact Reconnaissance Imaging Spectrometer orbiting the planet have shown water related mineral forms: opal (hydrated silica) and iron sulfates. These can be formed from the action of low temperature acid solutions reacting with basaltic rocks. These features of light-toned layered deposits strongly suggest that there was long lasting precipitation and surface runoff
during the Hesperian epoch of Martian history.

See also
Seasonal flows on warm Martian slopes
 Climate of Mars
 CRISM
 Eridania Lake
 Evidence of water on Mars from Mars Odyssey
 Geology of Mars
 Glacier 
 Glaciers on Mars
 Lakes on Mars
 Martian gullies
 Ring mold craters
 Water on Mars

External links 
   Martian Ice - Jim Secosky - 16th Annual International Mars Society Convention

References

Mars Reconnaissance Orbiter
Water on Mars
Exploration of Mars